Wild lettuce is a common name for several lactucarium-containing plants related to lettuce (Lactuca sativa). The name most often refers to Lactuca virosa (Europe, Asia, introduced to North America), though it may also refer to:

 Lactuca canadensis (North America)
 Lactuca ludoviciana (NW America)
 Lactuca serriola (Southern Europe)
 Lactuca quercina (Eurasia)
 Lactuca floridana (North America)

Lactuca
Lettuce
Medicinal plants